Edward McKenna VC (15 February 1827 – 8 June 1908) was a British Army soldier and a recipient of the Victoria Cross, the highest award for gallantry in the face of the enemy that can be awarded to British and Commonwealth forces.

Victoria Cross
McKenna was 36 years old, and a colour sergeant in the  65th Regiment of Foot (later the 1st Bn, York and Lancaster Regiment) during the Invasion of Waikato, when the following deed took place for which he was awarded the VC:

Later career and life

For this deed he was also commissioned with the rank of ensign. In October 1865 his regiment was recalled to England, but Edward had grown attached to the colony, he sold his commission and remained. He joined the New Zealand Railways as a clerk and soon rose to be Station Master at Kaiapoi, Ashburton, Invercargill, Gore, Greatford, Halcombe and in the early 1880s Palmerston North. He eventually retired to Palmerston North where he later died. He is buried at Terrace End Cemetery, Palmerston North in Presbyterian Block II, plot 65.

The medal
His Medal is displayed in the Auckland War Memorial Museum. The archives also contain his gun and uniform.

References

1827 births
1908 deaths
York and Lancaster Regiment soldiers
65th Regiment of Foot officers
British recipients of the Victoria Cross
British military personnel of the New Zealand Wars
New Zealand Wars recipients of the Victoria Cross
English emigrants to New Zealand
British Army recipients of the Victoria Cross
Military personnel from Leeds
Burials at Terrace End Cemetery